In academia, a "mill" may refer to:
Author mill
Diploma mill
Essay mill
Paper mill

See also
Accreditation mill

Academic terminology